Essex Property Trust is a publicly traded real estate investment trust that invests in apartments, primarily on the West Coast of the United States.

As of December 31, 2020, the company owned interests in 246 apartment complexes, aggregating 60,272 apartment units, and 1 office building comprising 106,716 square feet.

It is the 10th largest owner of apartments in the United States and the 20th largest apartment property manager in the United States.

History
The company was founded in 1971 by billionaire George M. Marcus, who also founded Marcus & Millichap that same year.

On June 13, 1994, the company became a public company via an initial public offering.

In April 2014, the company acquired BRE Properties for $4.3 billion and was added to the S&P 500.

References

External links

Financial services companies established in 1971
1971 establishments in California
1994 initial public offerings
Real estate companies established in 1971
Companies based in San Mateo, California
Companies listed on the New York Stock Exchange
Real estate investment trusts of the United States